The Ambassador of the Republic of the Union of Myanmar to Malaysia is the head of Myanmar's diplomatic mission to Malaysia. The position has the rank and status of an Ambassador Extraordinary and Plenipotentiary and is based in the Embassy of Myanmar, Kuala Lumpur.

List of heads of mission

Ambassadors to Malaysia

See also

 Malaysia–Myanmar relations

References 

 
Malaysia
Myanmar